The 2011–12 season was Stenhousemuir's third consecutive season in the Scottish Second Division, having been promoted from the Scottish Third Division at the end of the 2008–09 season. Stenhousemuir also competed in the Challenge Cup, League Cup and the Scottish Cup.

Summary
Stenhousemuir finished fifth in the Second Division. They reached the first round of the Challenge Cup, the second round of the League Cup and the fourth round of the Scottish Cup.

Results & fixtures

Pre season

Scottish Second Division

Scottish Cup

Scottish League Cup

Scottish Challenge Cup

Squad 
Last updated 5 May 2012

|}

Disciplinary Record
Includes all competitive matches.
Last updated 5 May 2012

Awards

Last updated 14 May 2012

Team statistics

League table

Transfers

Players in

Players out

References

Stenhousemuir
Stenhousemuir F.C. seasons